Kyontawa is a populated area in Ayeyarwady Division, Myanmar (also known as Burma).

Populated places in Ayeyarwady Region